Bruna Vuletić (born 3 July 1999) is a Croatian taekwondo practitioner.

She won a bronze medal in lightweight at the 2019 World Taekwondo Championships, after being defeated by Caroline Santos in the semifinal. In 2019, she represented Croatia at the Summer Universiade in Naples, Italy and she won one of the bronze medals in the women's 62 kg event.

References

External links

1999 births
Living people
Croatian female taekwondo practitioners
World Taekwondo Championships medalists
Medalists at the 2019 Summer Universiade
Universiade medalists in taekwondo
Universiade bronze medalists for Croatia
21st-century Croatian women